Nicolas V de Neufville de Villeroy (14 October 1598 – 28 November 1685) was a French nobleman and marshal of France. He was marquis then (from 1651) 1st duke of Villeroy and (from 1663) peer of France, marquis d'Alincourt and lord of Magny, and acted as governor of the young Louis XIV.  His son François succeeded him as duke. He was the lover of Catherine-Charlotte de Gramont.

Life
He was the son of Charles de Neufville (1566–1642), marquis de Villeroy et d'Alincourt, and his second wife, Jacqueline de Harlay de Sancy. His grandfather Nicolas de Neufville served as a secretary of state under Charles IX, Henry III, Henry IV, and Louis XIII.

Nicolas de Neufville studied at the court of Louis XIII as an enfant d’honneur. In 1615, he was made governor of the Lyonnais under his father's supervision – an effective governor, he served in that post until his father's death in 1642. He served in Italy with Lesdiguières and was promoted to marshal of France on 20 October 1646 thanks to being the protégé of cardinal Jules Mazarin.

In March 1646, the queen-mother made marshal de Villeroy governor of Louis XIV, under Mazarin's authority chosen as "surintendent for the government and conduct of the king". It is difficult to attribute him any good or bad influence in the young king's education. He was made duke of Villeroy in September 1651 and admitted to the peerage of France in 1663. He served as Grand Master of France at Louis XIV's coronation and was made a knight of the Order of the Holy Spirit on 31 December 1661. Louis XIV also made him head of the Conseil royal des finances in 1661, a role (of particular importance at the time of the suppression of the surintendance des finances, but becoming largely honorific) he held until his death.

Hotel de Villeroy

In 1640 Nicolas de Villeroy built a hôtel particulier on 34 rue des Bourdonnais in the center of Paris in the district of les Halles. The House was built on the grounds of a former mansion already belonging to the Villeroy family since 1370. It has a second entrance from 9 rue des Dechargeurs
The beautiful courtyard of the building was frequently visited by the young King Louis XIV who lived in the nearby Palais Royal and played there as a child with his brother Prince Philippe d'Orleans.
The Hotel de Villeroy still exists today, and in 1984 it was protected as a historic monument. Part of it is today used by the International Exposition center Cremerie de Paris which hosted in June 2012 the Nike Barber Shop. The Barber Shop was the center of the advertisement campaign of the US company Nike, Inc. Information tours are organized every month giving the public the possibility to discover the staircase and the courtyard of the Hotel de Villeroy.

Family

Nicolas married on 11 July 1617 to Madeleine de Créquy.

They had four children:
 Charles de Neufville (died 1645), Marquis of Alincourt
 François de Neufville, (2nd) Duke of Villeroy (1644–1730),
  Françoise de Neufville (died 1701) married: (1) Just, Count of Tournon (†1644) (2, 1646) Henri d'Albert, Duke of Chaulnes (†1653), then (3) Jean Vignier, Marquis of Hauterive
  Catherine de Neufville (1639–1707), in 1660 married Louis of Lorraine, Count of Armangnac (1641–1718), and of Charny and de Brionne

Notes

1598 births
1685 deaths
Dukes of Villeroi
French generals
Governors of the Children of France
Marshals of France
17th-century peers of France
Peers created by Louis XIV